Dynamite Düx is a beat 'em up video game developed by Sega AM2 and released by Sega for arcades in 1988. Produced by Yu Suzuki and with music composed by Hiroshi Kawaguchi, the game uses the Sega System 16 arcade board, the same board used for Golden Axe and Altered Beast. It was ported to the Sega Master System, Amiga, Amstrad CPC, Atari ST, Commodore 64 and ZX Spectrum platforms in the following year. A Mega Drive version was planned but never released.

A girl named Lucy is kidnapped by the evil Sorcerer Achacha, and the player's mission is to rescue her. The game received positive reviews from critics, with Sinclair User magazine giving it the 1988 award for Most Original Game of the Year.

Gameplay 
The player controls one of two bow tie-wearing cartoon ducks named Bin (blue) and Pin (red). They are Lucy's pets, and must travel through six stages set in real locations, though everything else in the game is very cartoonish, reminiscent of Tex Avery. Two players can play at once, Bin is by default player one's character, Pin player two's. Each level ends with a boss battle. After stages 2 and 4 there is a bonus round where the two ducks box until time runs out, the player with the most health will win and receive 50,000 points.

Dynamite Düx uses only two buttons: the jump button (which is self-explanatory) and the attack button. The attack button allows the player(s) to use the Punch Glove or throw enemies in a manner like a cartoon. The attack button can also let him/her pick up and use numerous weapons including: rocks, bazookas and the game's signature weapon, bombs (hence the title). Unlike some of its contemporary side-scrollers, Dynamite Düx allows players to attack in all directions, including diagonally.

The game measures health unusually in that it uses a status bar located at the bottom of the screen. A player's status is made up of bars of health that are color-coded blue, yellow and red, which deplete when damage is taken. Along with a varied set of enemies (all oddball cartoonlike characters) each level has a number of other obstacles that can inflict damage on the player(s).

There are three types of power-ups: Food (replenishes health), weapons (all weapons will eventually 'expire' when their ammo depletes) and treasure chests (give the player(s) extra points or weapons).

Ports
The game was released for the Master System in 1989. The sprites are smaller and different, with many of the characters having noticeably fewer frames of animation. Many of the enemies' unique dying animations were cut or altered. There are fewer weapons and power-ups per level as well as fewer enemies per level. The story has also been altered. Instead of being her pet, Bin (Pin does not appear) is Mickael, Lucy's boyfriend. Mickael has been transformed into Bin the duck by Achacha (similar to Toki).

The Amiga and Atari ST versions include an alternate, intentionally offensive version of the opening cutscene. It is not in the game proper, but can only be accessed by editing game data with a hex editor.

Reception
In Japan, Game Machine listed Dynamite Düx on their February 15, 1989 issue as being the third most-successful table arcade unit of the month.

The arcade game received positive reviews from critics. Upon release, Clare Edgeley gave it a positive review in Computer and Video Games magazine. She called it "the most amusing game I've seen in a long while" with praise for the "delightful" graphics, "fantastic scenario" and the "variety of baddies" providing "an endless source of inspiration for anyone wanting to get into cartoon graphics." She found it refreshingly different from the violent action games popular in arcades at the time, and concluded it "might not be macho, but it's a laugh." Sinclair User reviewed the arcade game and gave it a rating of 9 out of 10, describing it as an entertaining pseudo-3D scroller with "a surreal sense of the ridiculous." Sinclair User later gave it the 1988 award for Most Original Game of the Year, calling it "a cutsie, surreal job that'll be tickling your ribs well into '89."

The Sega Master System port, upon release in 1989, received a positive review from Julian Rignall in Computer and Video Games. He gave it an overall score of 90%, with sub-ratings of 90% for graphics, 78% for sound, 86% for value, and 91% for playability. He said he "loved Dynamite Dux in the arcades, and this Sega version is the spitting image, combining superb, colourful graphics and highly addictive gameplay to give one of the best Sega games around." However, he criticized it for lacking the two-player co-op mode of the arcade original.

In a retrospective overview of the arcade game, Kurt Kalata of Hardcore Gaming 101 noted that, in contrast to the "dark and gritty rampages of violence" in other beat 'em ups (such as Double Dragon, Final Fight, Golden Axe and Streets of Rage), Dynamite Dux instead had a more light-hearted, "sillier" direction, stating "Dynamite Dux is to Double Dragon as Twinbee is to Xevious." He called it "an impossibly colorful and silly game" and said "it’s an attractive game with catchy music and a generally goofy atmosphere, so it’s worth a play through."

Legacy

Bean the Dynamite was created by Sega AM2 for Sonic the Fighters, a Sonic the Hedgehog fighting game, released initially for arcades in 1996 (it was given a limited US release as Sonic Championship) and finally ported to home consoles in 2005 as part of Sega's Sonic Gems Collection compilation; Bean is based solely on the characters Bin and Pin from Dynamite Düx (though he wears a neckerchief instead of a bow tie and Sonic's shoes instead of regular sneakers).

Bean also appeared in AM2's Sega Saturn fighting game Fighters Megamix as a bonus unlockable character (along with Bark the Polar Bear). He is unlocked by completing the fourth arcade mode 'Muscle' and fought against in the final arcade mode 'Bonus'. Its alternative costume is the original Bin from Dynamite Dux. He also appears as a character in the Sonic the Hedgehog comics from the Archie Comics company, which have made some allusions to Bin and Pin as being connected to him and a group of birds from the game Tails Adventure.

References

External links
 MAQUINITAS: Dynamite Dux Master System

1988 video games
Amiga games
Amstrad CPC games
Arcade video games
Atari ST games
Cancelled Sega Genesis games
Commodore 64 games
Sega-AM2 games
Master System games
Sega arcade games
Sega beat 'em ups
ZX Spectrum games
Video games about birds
Video games designed by Yu Suzuki
Video games developed in Japan
Video games scored by Hiroshi Kawaguchi
Cooperative video games